Shamkirchay is one of the tributaries of the Kura River located in northwestern part of Republic of Azerbaijan.

Overview
It starts in Gadabay district and ends in Shamkir.

See also
Rivers and lakes in Azerbaijan
Shamkir reservoir

References

Rivers of Azerbaijan
Shamkir District